Apios priceana is a rare species of flowering plant in the legume family known by the common names Price's potato-bean, Price's groundnut, and traveler's delight. It is a climbing yellow-green vine in the growing from a stout, potato-like tuber. The plant is native to the Southeastern United States.

Description 
It has a large underground tuber, distinguishing it from other Apios species. The fragrant pale pink or greenish-yellow pea-like flowers bloom in the summer.

Distribution and habitat 
The plant is native to the U.S. states of Alabama, Mississippi, Kentucky, and Tennessee. It occurred in Illinois in the past but its population there was destroyed. It is usually associated with openings in the forest canopy in mixed hardwood stands where ravine slopes grade into creek or stream bottoms.

Ecology 
The flowers are pollinated by bees and the long-tailed skipper (Urbanus proteus). 

The threatened status of the species is primarily due to habitat destruction, but other impacts such as disease, predation, and historical tuber collection have also contributed.

Conservation
With about 25 known occurrences, the plant is federally listed as a threatened species.

Uses
The plant was probably used as a food source by Indigenous peoples of the Americas and early white settlers.

References

External links
 
 USDA Plants Profile
 Price's Potato Bean
 USFWS. Threatened status for Apios priceana (Price’s Potato-bean). Federal Register January 5, 1990.

Phaseoleae
NatureServe imperiled species
Flora of the Great Lakes region (North America)
Flora of the Southeastern United States